Teru may refer to:

 Teru (woreda), a district of Afar Region, Ethiopia
 Ampelocissus abyssinica or Teru, an Ethiopian climbing vine

People with the name
Mononym
 Mika Saiki or Teru, beach volleyball player
 Teru (singer), vocalist of GLAY
 Teru (guitarist), guitarist for Versailles and Jupiter

Personal name
 Teru Fukui, politician, a member of the Liberal Democratic Party
 Teru Hasegawa, Japanese Esperantist,
 Teru Hayashi, Japanese-American cell biologist
 Teru Miyamoto, Japanese author
 Teru Shimada, Japanese-American actor
 Takakura Teru, Japanese novelist
 Matsudaira Teru, 19th-century aristocrat
 Kushihashi Teru, Japanese noble lady

Surname
 Misuzu Kaneko or Kaneko Teru, poet

Fictional
 Teru Mikami, a character in Death Note
 Teru Kurebayashi, the main character in Dengeki Daisy
 Teru Minamoto, an exorcist high-school student and supporting character in Toilet-Bound Hanako-kun

See also
 Teru teru bozu, a traditional Japanese handmade doll
 GodHand Teru, a Japanese manga
 Teruhisa Moriyama, former volleyball player

Japanese unisex given names